Isaac Newton was an English mathematician, natural philosopher, theologian, alchemist and one of the most influential scientists in human history. His Philosophiae Naturalis Principia Mathematica is considered to be one of the most influential books in the history of science, laying the groundwork for most of classical mechanics by describing universal gravitation and the three laws of motion. In mathematics, Newton shares the credit with Gottfried Leibniz for the development of the differential and integral calculus.

Because of the resounding impact of his work, Newton became a science icon, as did Albert Einstein after publishing his theory of relativity more than 200 years later. Many books, plays, and films focus on Newton or use Newton as a literary device. Newton's stature among scientists remains at the very top rank, as demonstrated by a 2005 survey of scientists in Britain's Royal Society (formerly headed by Newton) asking who had the greater effect on the history of science, Newton or Albert Einstein. Newton was deemed the more influential. In 1999, leading physicists voted Albert Einstein "greatest physicist ever"; Newton was the runner-up.

Visual arts
 William Blake created a colour copper engraving entitled Newton, in 1795. The engraving would serve as the basis for bronze statue Newton, made in 1995 by the sculptor Eduardo Paolozzi.

Poetry

English poet Alexander Pope was moved by Newton's accomplishments to write the famous epitaph:
Nature and nature's laws lay hid in night;
God said "Let Newton be" and all was light.

English poet J. C. Squire satirised this:
It could not last; the Devil shouting "Ho! Let Einstein be!" restored the status quo.

The following passage is from William Wordsworth's The Prelude, in which he describes a marble statue of Newton at Trinity College, Cambridge:
And from my pillow, looking forth by light
Of moon or favouring stars, I could behold
The antechapel where the statue stood
Of Newton with his prism and silent face,
The marble index of a mind for ever
Voyaging through strange seas of Thought, alone.

Jerusalem: The Emanation of the Giant Albion, William Blake
A Poem Sacred to the Memory of Sir Isaac Newton, James Thomson
The Movement of Bodies, Sheenagh Pugh

Literature

Books about Newton

Books featuring Newton as a character
 Newton and his alchemical experiments play a central role in the 2012 young adult novels The Prince of Soul and The Lighthouse by Fredrik Brounéus.
 Isaac Newton plays a significant role in The Age of Unreason, a series of four alternate history novels written by American science fiction and fantasy author Gregory Keyes.
 Newton is an important character in The Baroque Cycle by Neal Stephenson. A major theme of these novels is the emergence of modern science, with Newton's work in the Principia being prominent. Newton's interest in alchemy and the dispute over the discovery of calculus are prominent plot points, and there is a (fictional) debate on metaphysics between Newton and Gottfried Leibniz moderated by Caroline of Ansbach. The development of an economy based on money and credit is also a major theme, with Newton's time with the Royal Mint and intrigues against counterfeit leading to a Trial of the Pyx.
 Newton is a recurring character in Gotlib's Rubrique-à-Brac series of comics, where he repeatedly discovers gravity or randomly bizarre laws after being (often very heavily) hit on the head by various objects, including the famous apple.
 Newton is the protagonist of the 2002 Philip Kerr novel Dark Matter, set during the Great Recoinage.
 Newton is a major character in Michael White's 2006 novel Equinox.
 'Sir Isaac Newton' is a newt in The Tale of Mr. Jeremy Fisher by Beatrix Potter.
 The 2017 novel A Dragon's Guide to Making Your Human Smarter by Laurence Yep features Newton as a character, having lived to the present day due to finding the Philosopher's Stone. He is a teacher at the Spriggs Academy for ordinary humans and magical beings, and continues to create innovations such as a wormhole generator. Newton also displays a wry sense of humor, using his invention to prank Charles II, supposedly on the grounds of refusing to knight him.
 Newton is a significant historical character in Marvel's 616 universe, first as an inductee and subsequent member of the Brotherhood of the Shield, then as the sorcerer supreme of his era. He is shown to be super-intelligent and inventive and often plays a villainous role.

Books featuring Newton as a plot element
 Newton's alleged participation in the Priory of Sion; Newton's grave in Westminster Abbey provides the crucial clue in the mystery thriller The Da Vinci Code.
 Newton is credited as having invented the pet door (cat flap) as a monumental life achievement in Douglas Adams’s Dirk Gently's Holistic Detective Agency (1987).
 "Ghostwalk" is a story mainly about the mystery between Newton and Ezekiel Foxcroft's crime.
 In Ben Aaronovitch's Peter Grant series of novels, Newton formalised the system and practice of magic in the United Kingdom in a process referred to as "The Newtonian Synthesis". Newton was also a founder of The Folly, the United Kingdom's state magical institution.

Plays
 Arcadia, Tom Stoppard, includes long discussions of topics of mathematical interest including: Fermat's Last Theorem and Newtonian determinism
 Five Fugues For Isaac Newton, Rae Davis
 Calculus, Carl Djerassi
 Small Infinities, Alan Brody, MIT
 Character in the play In Good King Charles's Glorious Days - by George Bernard Shaw
 The Physicists, a satiric drama by Friedrich Dürrenmatt
 Let Newton Be!, a verbatim play constructed from the published and unpublished words of Newton and his immediate contemporaries by Craig Baxter

TV and radio
 In 1982, Dan Kern played Newton in an episode of Voyagers!, "Cleo and the Babe".
 From 1983 until 1998, Newton's Apple ran on PBS and was based around answering science questions for children.
 Trevor Howard guest-starred as Newton in the 1986 mini-series Peter the Great.
 In 1993, John Neville played Newton in an episode of Star Trek: The Next Generation, "Descent".
 In 1996, Newton was the main villain of the anime The Vision of Escaflowne as Emperor Dornkirk.
 In 1996 and 1997, Newton was played by Peter Dennis in the Star Trek: Voyager episodes "Death Wish" and "Darkling".
 In 2007, David Warner portrayed Newton in the Doctor Who audio drama Circular Time. The Fourth Doctor had previously mentioned his acquaintance with Newton in the TV serials Shada and The Five Doctors (the same footage reused).
 In the Japanese television show, Kamen Rider Ghost, the ghost of Isaac Newton helps the main character Takeru Tenkuji/Kamen Rider Ghost to access his gravity-controlling Newton Damashii form. Newton's ghost also helps him on his journey to unite the 15 Heroic souls.

Films and video
 Harpo Marx played Newton in a comic appearance in the film The Story of Mankind.
 Me & Isaac Newton, (1999) is a documentary, by Michael Apted, about seven scientists.
 "Weird Al" Yankovic portrayed Newton in a third-season episode of the web series Epic Rap Battles of History.
 Newton appears in the web series Super Science Friends where he is the hero of a teenage Albert Einstein.

Video games
 Empire: Total War features Isaac Newton, to Britain in the Grand Campaign.

Newtonmas

Some atheists, sceptics, and others have referred to 25 December as Newtonmas, a tongue-in-cheek reference to Christmas. Celebrants send cards with "Reason's Greetings!" printed inside, and exchange boxes of apples and science-related items as gifts. The celebration may have had its origin in a meeting of the Newton Association at Christmas 1890 to talk, distribute gifts, and share laughter and good cheer. The name Newtonmas can be attributed to The Skeptics Society, which needed an alternative name for its Christmas party. Another name for this holiday is Gravmas (also spelt Gravmass or Grav-mass) which is an abbreviation of "gravitational mass" due to Newton's Theory of Gravitation.

On 25 December 2014, American astrophysicist Neil deGrasse Tyson tweeted:  In a subsequent interview, Tyson denied being "anti-Christian", noting that Jesus' true birthdate is unknown.

Newton's birthday was 25 December under the Old Style Julian Calendar used in Protestant England at the time, but was 4 January under the New Style Gregorian Calendar used simultaneously in Catholic Europe. The period between has been proposed for a holiday season called "10 Days of Newton" to commemorate this.

See also
 :Category:Cultural depictions of scientists
 List of cultural icons of England
 List of things named after Isaac Newton

References

Further reading

External links
 

Newton, Isaac
Observances about science